Pyotr Ivanovich Yezhov (born October 12, 1900, in Gatchina; died January 17, 1975, in Moscow) was a Soviet football player and manager.

Honours
 RSFSR champion: 1924

International career
Yezhov played his only game for USSR on November 16, 1924, in a friendly against Turkey.

External links
  Profile

1900 births
1975 deaths
People from Gatchina
People from Tsarskoselsky Uyezd
Soviet footballers
Russian footballers
Soviet Union international footballers
Soviet football managers
PFC CSKA Moscow managers
Association football defenders
FC Dynamo Saint Petersburg players
Honoured Masters of Sport of the USSR
Sportspeople from Leningrad Oblast